William John Wright (24 February 1909 — 12 August 1988) was an English cricketer who played for Derbyshire during the 1932 season.

Wright was born in Danesmoor, Clay Cross, Derbyshire. He made his debut for Derbyshire in the 1932 season against touring Indians in August, in which he scored 23 in his first innings. Wright's only other match for Derbyshire was three days later in a County Championship match against Northamptonshire. Wright, opening the batting, made 28, and Derbyshire won by an innings and 123 runs, thanks to eleven match wickets by Test cricketer Leslie Townsend.

Wright  was a right-handed batsman and played 3 innings in 2 first-class matches with an average of 19.33 and a top score of 28.

Wright died in Poole, Dorset.

References

1909 births
1988 deaths
English cricketers
Derbyshire cricketers